Luis de Morales (1618–1679) was a Roman Catholic prelate who served as the Auxiliary Bishop of Toledo (1661–1679).

De Morales was born in Belmonte, Spain, in 1618 and ordained a priest in the Order of Saint Augustine.  On 5 September 1661, he was appointed during the papacy of Pope Alexander VII as the Auxiliary Bishop of Toledo and the Titular Bishop of Troas. He served as the Auxiliary Bishop of Toledo until his death in 1679.He was 61 years old.

Episcopal succession

References 

1618 births
1679 deaths
17th-century Roman Catholic bishops in Spain
Bishops appointed by Pope Alexander VII
Augustinian bishops